KPJR-TV (channel 38) is a religious television station licensed to Greeley, Colorado, United States, serving the Denver area as an owned-and-operated station of the Trinity Broadcasting Network (TBN). The station's studios are located on Yates Street in Westminster, and its transmitter is located in rural southwestern Weld County, east of Frederick.

History

KPJR-TV first signed on the air on June 12, 2009; as it launched on the date in which full-power television stations in the United States transitioned from analog to digital broadcasts under federal mandate, the station was the first television station in the Denver market that did not launch with a companion analog signal.

Subchannels
This station's digital signal, like most other full-service TBN owned-and-operated stations, carries five different TBN-run networks.

References

External links
www.tbn.org – Trinity Broadcasting Network official website

Trinity Broadcasting Network affiliates
Television channels and stations established in 2009
PJR-TV
2009 establishments in Colorado